I've Been Floating Down the Old Green River is a 1915 song with words by Bert Kalmar and music by Joe Cooper.

The song is sung from the point of view of a husband who has to explain to his wife why he stayed out until 4:30 in the morning. He states that he has been floating down the old Green River on the good ship "Rock and Rye", where he got "stuck on a bar". The tag line in the lyric is:

I had to drink the whole Green River dry
To get back home to you.

The song is a play on words, as Green River was a popular brand of whiskey at the time.

The popular vocalist Billy Murray recorded the song on March 11, 1915 for Victor Records (catalog No. 17885B).

Russ Morgan and His Orchestra recorded the song for Decca Records (catalog No. 24834) in 1949.

Kenny Ball and His Jazzmen included the song on the 1964 album Jazz Band Ball and it was later included in the compilation The Pye Jazz Albums (2003).

References

External links
Lyrics
Recording by Billy Murray

1915 songs
Billy Murray (singer) songs
Songs with lyrics by Bert Kalmar